The 2016–17 season was Mansfield Town's 120th season in their history and their fourth consecutive season in League Two.

Results

Pre-season friendlies

League Two

League table

FA Cup

League Cup

EFL Trophy

Northern Group E

Squad statistics

Transfers

Transfers in

Transfers out

Loans in

Loans out

References

Mansfield Town F.C. seasons
Mansfield Town